Tarnaszentmiklós is a village in Heves County, Northern Hungary Region, Hungary.

Sights to visit
 church
 ostrich farm

References

External links

  in Hungarian
 Önkormányzati adatlap (Hungarian)
 foldhivatalok.geod.hu

Populated places in Heves County